A naval brigade is a body of sailors serving in a ground combat role to augment land forces.

Australia
Prior to the Federation of Australia, several of the Australian colonies had their own Naval Brigades with New South Wales also having a separate Naval Artillery Volunteers who manned coast artillery. These units took part in the suppression of the Boxer Rebellion in China.

Germany
During the German Revolution of 1918–19, mutineering sailors of the Imperial German Navy formed the Volksmarinedivision, the best-trained and organised force available to the revolutionary socialists. They defeated regular army troops and battled the right-wing Freikorps over the direction of postwar Germany.

Russia

During the October Revolution and Russian Civil War, Bolshevik sailors were involved in storming the Winter Palace. When the Nazis invaded Russia, sailors were diverted from the battleships to aid in the defence of Leningrad and Sevastopol. Throughout the war, Russian naval infantry distinguished themselves in land combat, and eventually earned special forces status.

United Kingdom
Within the Royal Navy, a naval brigade is a large temporary detachment of Royal Marines and of seamen from the Royal Navy formed to undertake operations on shore, particularly during the mid- to late-19th century. Seamen were specifically trained in land-based warfare at the gunnery school at HMS Excellent in Portsmouth.

The Royal Navy fought only one ship-to-ship action ( and  against the Peruvian ship Huascar in 1877) between 1850 and 1914, so, for much of that period, its only active service was on shore, through naval brigades formed from the men aboard its vessels. Naval brigades were used in engagements including:
the Battle of Bunker Hill (1774)
the Invasion of Île de France (1810)
the Burma Wars (1824–85)
the Crimean War (1854–6)
the Second Opium War (1856–60)
the Indian Mutiny (1857–9)
the New Zealand Wars (1860–4)
the Bombardment of Kagoshima and the Battle of Shimonoseki (1863–64)
the Abyssinian expedition (1867–8)
the Second Ashanti War (1873–4)
the Zulu War (1879)
the Transvaal War (1881)
the 1882 Anglo-Egyptian War
the Anglo-Sudanese War (1884–5)
the Benin Expedition of 1897
the Boer War (1899–1900)
the Boxer Rebellion in China (1900)

A Royal Naval Division—later designated the 63rd (Royal Naval) Division—was formed in the First World War to make use of surplus reserves of the Royal Navy who were not required at sea. It included two naval brigades and a brigade of Royal Marines, and fought in the defence of Antwerp in 1914, the Battle of Gallipoli in 1915, and the Battle of the Somme in 1916. Few naval personnel remained in the Division by July 1916, and it was redesignated as the 63rd Division. The division was demobilised in April 1919.

United States

During the siege of Veracruz of 1847 in the Mexican–American War, a naval contingent of 1200 men joined the landing force.

During the American Civil War, both sides employed naval brigades at the siege of Petersburg. The Confederate naval brigade was commanded by Captain John R. Tucker. It was attached to George Washington Custis Lee's Division, under Lieutenant General Richard Ewell's Richmond Defense Forces. During the retreat to Appomattox, the brigade was captured at the Battle of Sayler's Creek on 6 April 1865. s. The Union naval brigade was under the Army of the James under Major General Benjamin Butler. It was commanded by Brigadier General Charles K. Graham and was not assigned to either of the two corps of the army.
 
During the war on terror in Iraq and Afghanistan, individual augmentees from the United States Navy served in the Army to make up for a shortfall of army personnel.

See also
Marines
Pearl's Naval Brigade
Australian Naval and Military Expeditionary Force, a combined army and naval infantry force established in the early days of World War I

Notes

References
Information Sheet No. 31, naval brigades, from the Royal Naval Museum
Roster of Black Soldiers in the Appomattox Campaign
Sailors of Confederacy Played Big Part in Noted Land Battles, 1936 article from the Richmond Times Dispatch
Story of the siege of Petersburg from 1864 to 1865, from USGENNET.

External links
Landing Party Manual, United States Navy (1950)

Marines
Royal Navy ad hoc formations
Ad hoc units and formations of the United States